Peter Joseph Travers (born ) is an American film critic, journalist, and television presenter. He reviews films for ABC News and previously served as a movie critic for People and Rolling Stone. Travers also hosts the film interview program Popcorn with Peter Travers for ABC News.

Early life and education
Travers grew up in Yonkers, New York, the only child of Howard and Ruth Travers. He received a BA degree from Manhattan College in 1965 before graduating from New York University with an MA in English.

Career
According to eFilmCritic.com, Travers is the nation's most "blurbed" film critic. Travers' blurbs were being printed in newspapers as early as 1970, when he was a writer for Reader's Digest. By the mid-1970s, he was a film critic for The Herald Statesman, a Yonkers newspaper. In the 1980s, he wrote for People for four years before joining Rolling Stone in 1989. In 2020, he departed Rolling Stone and became the film critic for ABC News.

Travers hosts the New York Film Critics Series, a company that hosts live-streamed screening events and discussions, as well as the ABC News show Popcorn with Peter Travers, where he interviews actors and directors about the latest projects and their lives.

Personal life
Travers married Diane Harris of White Plains, New York in 1967; the marriage ended in divorce. In 1980, Travers married Robyn Lee Reeves, an actress and graduate of Vassar College, in an Episcopalian ceremony. He has three children: Jennifer, David and Alex.

Preferences

Favorites 
In 2010, When asked to rank the best films of the 2000s decade, Travers named:

1. There Will Be Blood (2007)
2. Children of Men (2006)
3. Mulholland Drive (2001)
4. A History of Violence (2005)
5. No Country for Old Men (2007)
6. The Incredibles (2004)
7. Brokeback Mountain (2005)
8. The Departed (2006)
9. Mystic River (2003)
10. The Lord of the Rings (2001-2003)

Best of the year 
Since his career as a film critic from People to Rolling Stone, Travers marked these films the best of the year:

References

External links 
 Peter Travers at Good Morning America

20th-century American journalists
American male journalists
20th-century American male writers
21st-century American journalists
21st-century American male writers
ABC News people
American film critics
National Society of Film Critics Members
American magazine writers
American television journalists
Living people
New York University alumni
Place of birth missing (living people)
Rolling Stone people
Year of birth missing (living people)